Olaf of Sweden also "Onela" - Swedish: Olov or Olof - may refer to:

Onela, mythological Swedish ruler
Olof (I) of Sweden, Swedish king in 854 (speculative numeral)
Olof Björnsson, Olof "II", Swedish king (reigned ca. 970–975) (speculative numeral)
Olof Skötkonung, Swedish king (995–1022)
Olav IV of Norway (1370–1387), Swedish prince, also King of Denmark and Norway